Gary William Gibbons  (born 1 July 1946) is a British theoretical physicist.

Education
Gibbons was born in Coulsdon, Surrey. He was educated at Purley County Grammar School and the University of Cambridge, where in 1969 he became a research student under the supervision of Dennis Sciama. When Sciama moved to the University of Oxford, he became a student of Stephen Hawking, obtaining his PhD from Cambridge in 1973.

Career and research
Apart from a stay at the Max Planck Institute in Munich in the 1970s he has remained in Cambridge throughout his career, becoming a full professor in 1997, a Fellow of the Royal Society in 1999, and a Fellow of Trinity College, Cambridge in 2002.

Having worked on classical general relativity for his PhD thesis, Gibbons focused on the quantum theory of black holes afterwards. Together with Malcolm Perry, he used thermal Green's functions to prove the universality of thermodynamic properties of horizons, including cosmological event horizons. He developed the Euclidean approach to quantum gravity with Stephen Hawking, which allows a derivation of the thermodynamics of black holes from a functional integral approach. As the Euclidean action for gravity is not positive definite, the integral only converges when a particular contour is used for conformal factors.

His work in more recent years includes contributions to research on supergravity, p-branes and M-theory, mainly motivated by string theory. Gibbons remains interested in geometrical problems of all sorts which have applications to physics.

Awards and honours
Gibbons was elected a Fellow of the Royal Society (FRS) in 1999. His nomination reads

References

Alumni of St Catharine's College, Cambridge
Alumni of Clare College, Cambridge
English physicists
Fellows of the Royal Society
Fellows of Trinity College, Cambridge
Living people
Cambridge mathematicians
British string theorists
1946 births